Vorya may refer to:

 Vorya (Klyazma), a river in Russia, tributary of the Klyazma
 Vorya (Ugra), a river in Russia, tributary of the Ugra